Berthiaume-Du-Tremblay Stadium is an outdoor football and soccer stadium located in Parc Berthiaume-Du-Tremblay in Chomedey, a suburb of Laval, Quebec, Canada a short distance from Montreal Island.

References

Sports venues in Quebec
Buildings and structures in Laval, Quebec
Sport in Laval, Quebec
Soccer venues in Quebec